Papan Reservoir, is a reservoir of the Ak-Buura River, located in Nookat District of Osh Region of Kyrgyzstan. It is used for irrigation purposes and also water supply of Osh.

References

Reservoirs built in the Soviet Union
Reservoirs in Kyrgyzstan